Luis Hurtado de Mendoza y Pacheco, 2nd Marquess of Mondéjar  (born 1489 in Mondejar, Guadalajara, Spain; died 19 December 1566) was a Spanish nobleman.

He was the son of Íñigo López de Mendoza y Quiñones, second Count of Tendilla (born Guadalajara 1440; died Granada, Spain, 15 July 1515).
He was the first member of the House of Mendoza that supported Charles of Habsburg during the Revolt of the Comuneros, despite the fact that his own sister María Pacheco and her husband Juan López de Padilla were amongst the leaders of the revolt.

In 1525, he led a failed attempt to reconquer Peñón de Vélez de la Gomera. 
He remained loyal to King Charles for his entire life and received many important titles and functions.
He became the third Count of Tendilla; Viceroy of Navarre in 1543–1546; President of the Council of Indies in 1546–1559; and President of the Council of Castile in 1561–1563.

He married with Catalina Mendoza y Zúñiga and had 
 Francisco Hurtado de Mendoza y Mendoza, predeceased his father when he drowned in the La Herradura naval disaster (1562) 
 Francisca Mendoza y Mendoza, married Baltasar Ladron De La Maza 
 Iñigo López de Mendoza y Mendoza (1511–1580), 3rd Marquis of Mondejar, married Maria Mendoza Y Aragón, daughter of Íñigo López de Mendoza, 4th Duke of the Infantado

Further reading
Colección de documentos inéditos para la historia de España (1842), vol. XXXV, (1859), pags. 388–401. https://archive.org/details/coleccindedocu35madruoft
http://www.uam.es/personal_pdi/ciencias/depaz/mendoza/monde2.htm
https://books.google.com/books?id=MBTH_kLwnYAC&pg=PA52

1489 births
1566 deaths
Marquesses of Spain
Viceroys of Navarre